Leigh Ann Caldwell   is an American political reporter for The Washington Post.

Early life
Caldwell was raised in Las Vegas. She was an accomplished swimmer during her high school days and attended North Carolina State University on a four year scholarship for distance swimming.  She majored in Communications and Political Science, graduating in 2000.

Career
Caldwell moved to New York City after graduating and became a freelance journalist. She won an investigative journalism award from the Independent Press Association for her coverage of the rebuilding of New York City after the September 11 attacks. From 2004 to 2012, she launched Radio Rootz, an education initiative for youth. She has worked for Free Speech Radio News (2006–2011), C-SPAN (2011), Radio France Internationale, CBS News (2012–2013), and CNN (2013–2014). During the 2008 United States presidential election, she hosted a daily syndicated election show, Election Unspun. 

Caldwell joined NBC News in 2014 and served as a Capitol Hill correspondent until moving to CAA in 2019. She covered the 2018–2019 United States federal government shutdown, both impeachment trials of President Donald Trump, the January 6 United States Capitol attack and its aftermath, and four Supreme Court confirmations, including those for Brett Kavanaugh and Amy Coney Barrett. In April 2022, she announced that she was joining The Washington Post to write a morning newsletter and host live events.

Personal life
She is married to physicist Gregory Jaczko and has two children.

References

External links
  

1978 births
Living people
American political journalists
American television reporters and correspondents
American women television journalists
North Carolina State University alumni
MSNBC people
NBC News people